is a railway station on the Nippō Main Line operated by Kyūshū Railway Company in Hiji, Ōita,  Japan.

Lines

Layout 
The station consists of an island platform serving two tracks on an embankment. Access to the platform is by a flight of steps from within an underpass which goes through the embankment and which also serves as a free passage, connecting the streets on both sides of the tracks. A simple timber station building on the island platform houses a staffed ticket window and awaiting area.

The station is  not staffed by JR Kyushu but the local town authorities act as a kan'i itaku agent manages the ticket window which is equipped with a POS machine.

Adjacent stations

History
The Kyushu Railway was nationalised on 1 July 1907. Japanese Government Railways (JGR), designated the track as the Hōshū Main Line on 12 October 1909 and expanded it southwards in phases, with Hiji opening as the new southern terminus on 22 March 1911. On 15 December 1923, the Hōshū Main Line was renamed the Nippō Main Line. With the privatization of Japanese National Railways (JNR), the successor of JGR, on 1 April 1987, the station came under the control of JR Kyushu.

The station became unstaffed on 1 April 2016.  In order to maintain service to the residents, the Hiji town authorities took over the staffing of the ticket window as a kan'i itaku agent.

Passenger statistics
In fiscal 2016, the station was used by an average of 533 passengers daily (boarding passengers only), and it ranked 238th among the busiest stations of JR Kyushu.

See also
List of railway stations in Japan

References

External links

  

Railway stations in Ōita Prefecture
Railway stations in Japan opened in 1911